Nicolás Villafañe (born May 19, 1988 in Buenos Aires, Argentina) is an Argentine footballer who is currently playing for Ierapetra in the Greek Gamma Ethniki as a midfielder.

References

External links
 Scoresway Profile
 Profile at BDFA 
 Profile at Fútbol Talentos

1988 births
Living people
Argentine footballers
Argentine expatriate footballers
Argentine expatriate sportspeople in Spain
Boca Juniors footballers
Olaria Atlético Clube players
San Marcos de Arica footballers
Santiago Morning footballers
Atlético Sanluqueño CF players
Panachaiki F.C. players
AEZ Zakakiou players
Panelefsiniakos F.C. players
Estudiantes de Mérida players
Episkopi F.C. players
Primera B de Chile players
Argentine Primera División players
Football League (Greece) players
Gamma Ethniki players
Cypriot First Division players
Cypriot Second Division players
Expatriate footballers in Chile
Expatriate footballers in Brazil
Expatriate footballers in Italy
Expatriate footballers in Venezuela
Expatriate soccer players in Australia
Expatriate footballers in Cyprus
Expatriate footballers in Greece
Association football midfielders
Sportspeople from Mar del Plata